At the 1966 British Empire and Commonwealth Games, the athletics events were held at Independence Park in Kingston, Jamaica. A total of 34 events were contested, of which 23 by male and 11 by female athletes. This was the final athletics competition at the quadrennial games to feature events measured in imperial, rather than metric units. It was also the last edition to allow four athletes from each country in a single event before that number was reduced to three. Eleven Games records were improved over the course of the competition.

Medal summary

Men

Women

Medal table

Participating nations

 (2)
 (7)
 (32)
 (14)
 (8)
 (6)
 (4)
 (35)
 (1)
 (61)
 (1)
 (10)
 (1)
 (3)
 (6)
 (3)
 (49)
 (21)
 (5)
 (6)
 (17)
 (21)
 (5)
 (5)
 (2)
 (2)
 (18)
 (11)
 (2)
 (4)
 (16)
 (6)
 (12)

References
Commonwealth Games Medallists - Men. GBR Athletics. Retrieved on 2010-08-13.
Commonwealth Games Medallists - Women. GBR Athletics. Retrieved on 2010-08-13.

1966 British Empire and Commonwealth Games events
1966
British Empire and Commonwealth Games
1966 British Empire and Commonwealth Games